The Anthology of Indian Classical Music – A Tribute to Alain Daniélou is the 1997 edition of Alain Danielou's Anthology of Indian Classical Music.

Background
This collection was originally recorded by Alain Danielou for the International Music Council (UNESCO) between 1950 and 1955, and was published in 1966. As a tribute to Alain Daniélou, UNESCO re-issued the album on 1997 as Anthology of Indian Classical Music - A Tribute to Alain Daniélou. The introductory text is by Serge Moreux.

Musical style, writing, composition
The album contains Indian classical music performances by some of the prominent Indian musicians at that time.

Artwork, packaging
The album comes as a three CD compilation.

Accolades
The series received the "Diapason d'Or" award and the "Grand Prix du Disque" in 1998.

Track listing

Disc 1
 Le Mode Bhairavi (Raghunath Prasanna, Durga Prasanna, Katvaru Lal)  - 3:17
Khyal (Mohin Ud Din Dagar, Amin Ud Din Dagar)  - 6:24
Le Mode Ahiri-Lalita (Ravi Shankar)  - 5:40
Le Mode Malkosh ( Mishra Shyam Lal & D.K. Chatterji) -5:56
Le Mode Todî (Narayan Das Mishra & Mishra Shyam Lal	) - 3:39
Gat (Svami D.R. Parvatikar) - 3:12
Tabla Solo (Chaturial) - 3:26
Sitar, Sarode Et Tabla (Ravi Shankar, Ali Akbar Khan & Chaturial) - 13:51
Alap (Mohin Ud Din Dagar & Amin Ud Din Dagar) - 3:49
Le Mode Sindhi-Bhairavi (Ali Akbar Khan) - 5:01

Disc 2
Thumri (Raghunath Prasanna & Motilal) - 3:21
Svara Mandala (Svami D.R. Parvatikar)  - 3:10
Bhajana (Nandan Prasad & Mishra Shyam Lal)  - 5:57
Le Mode Suha Kamode (Svami D.R. Parvatikar)  - 12:42
Jatisvaram (Bala Sarasvati Orchestra)  - 4:01
Alapana (P.R. Balasubrahmanyam)  - 2:30
Alapana (K.S. Pichiappa, K.M. Dakshinamurti, T. Subrahmanya Pillai & Muthu Kumaram) - 3:18
Kriti (Kamala Krishnamurti)  - 5:00
Tirmana (K. Ganeshan) - 0:59
Le Mode Varali (D. K. Pattammal, Tiruvallur Subrahmanyam, Palghat Kunjumani & Shiva Pattamal)  - 9:48
Ganesha Kumara (Budalur Krishnamurti Shastri, Varahur Muthusvami Aiyar & Tinniyam Venkatarama Aiyar)  - 4:34

Disc 3
Pallavi (Mudi Kondan C. Venkatarama, Vellore Gopalachari, M. Chandrasekaran & Karaikudi Mutha)  - 6:06
Javali  (T. Viswanathan & T. Ranganathan)  - 4:03
Pallavi (Unknown Artist) - 9:02
Javali (D. K. Pattammal, Kalyan Krishna Bhagavatar & Karaikudi Muttu Aiyar)  - 2:52
Sdhincene (Kalyan Krishna Bhagavatar, Devakotai Narayana Iyengar & Karaikudi Mutha)  - 4:57
Varnam (Radha Shri Ram Orchestra)  - 4:00
Varnam (S. Vidya) - 3:09
Varnam (Bala Saravasti Orchestra)  - 7:17
Sandehamunu (T. Viswanathan & T. Ranganathan)  - 4:49
Ninyako (Tiruvallur Subrahmanyam, D. K. Pattammal, Palghat Kunjumani & Shiva Pattamal)  - 4:25
Solo De Mridangam (Muthu Kumaram) - 3:34
Jnana Vinayakané (Radha Shri Ram Orchestra)  - 1:42

Personnel

Credits
 Jacques Brunet - liner notes
Noriko Aikawa - liner notes
Serge Moreux - liner notes
Jacques Cloarec - liner notes, photography
Raymond Burnier - photography
S. Bassouls - photography
Alain Daniélou - recording, photography, illustration (inside drawings), liner notes

See also 

Unesco Collection: A Musical Anthology of the Orient

References

External links 
Smithsonian Recordings - Anthology of Indian Classical Music: A Tribute to Alain Daniélou
Alain Danielou
Unesco

Indian classical music
Indology
Hindustani music literature
Carnatic music